The Williams–Woodland Park Local Historic District was established in 1985 and is a national historic district located at Fort Wayne, Indiana. The district encompasses 287 contributing buildings in a predominantly residential section of Fort Wayne located approximately one mile south of downtown. The area was developed from about 1875 to 1940, and includes notable examples of Colonial Revival, Prairie School, and Queen Anne style residential architecture.

It was listed on the National Register of Historic Places in 1991.

References

External links
 

Historic districts on the National Register of Historic Places in Indiana
Prairie School architecture in Indiana
Queen Anne architecture in Indiana
Colonial Revival architecture in Indiana
National Register of Historic Places in Fort Wayne, Indiana
1985 establishments in Indiana